Dunia Elvir (born June 9, 1973 in La Ceiba, Honduras) is a television journalist, producer, motivational speaker and autism advocate.

Early life and education
Dunia has 2 brothers Orlando and Carlos Elvir. She is the oldest, Orlando is 5 years younger and Carlitos (as Dunia calls her younger brother) is 8 years younger than her. Her mother took under her care two of her cousins; Claudia and Maricela who became the sisters Dunia always wanted to have. 
Growing up in Barrio La Isla in La Ceiba, Dunia used to play soccer and "bate" (baseball) in the street. 
Dunia was 6 years old when her father bought her first microphone and radio. Dunia enjoyed playing and pretending to be an announcer.

At 15 years old Dunia was sent to Los Angeles, California to live with her maternal grandmother. She went to Jordan High School in Los Angeles and earned her high school diploma as an ESL (English as a Second Language) student. Later on she earned her broadcast degree in American Communication Institute in Hollywood in 1991. Like many other immigrants, Dunia faced many challenges while trying to excel in her career. Dunia graduated with a limited knowledge of English. This and the lack of immigration documents prevented her from continuing with her higher education. 
In 1992  her first son, Jesus was born. Jesus has autism, this made her chose home life in order to take care of him. In 1997 Dunia's second son Lalo (Eduardo) was born.
A few years later this first marriage had a rocky patch and the couple separated in July 2001, when Dunia left the house with her two children. 
On April 12, 2003 Dunia married Carl Procida.

In December 2004 Dunia decided to start college, this idea was a mutual dream of her and her husband. While trying to accomplish their higher education as a couple Dunia 
and Carl had two girls. Adrianna and Josieanna, came to make the relationship even stronger. By November 2008 Dunia and Carl graduated from University of Phoenix with a Bachelors in Business Management.
This educational goal gave Dunia the opportunity to grow within Telemundo. At this point Telemundo is not only providing Dunia with the opportunity to work, fulfill her dream profession but is also helping her to grow intellectually allowing her to go back to college and pursue her MBA, which Dunia completed in November 2011, and with her husband as her classmate.

Career
Elvir started her career in California in Mexican Radio in 1989. She later moved to KRCA Channel 62 in Los Angeles as reporter and TV news presenter.

Since 2001, she has worked for Telemundo in Los Angeles. She was also a correspondent on the TV program Cada día con Maria Antonieta (Every day with Maria Antonieta Collins). Actually Elvir also reports for Telemundo Network shows Levantate Al Rojo Vivo, Noticiero Telemundo and the Los Angeles morning show "Buenos Dias".

In 2014 Elvir was the only female in California's  gubernatorial  debate between Governor Jerry Brown and Neel Kashkari  in Sacramento. This was the first time a Hispanic female served as a moderator in the Golden State gubernatorial debate.
Elvir also moderated the World Leaders event where Prime Minister Tony Blair and Vicente Fox discussed immigration, education, politics among other topics. 
She has interviewed Anthony Hopkins, Benicio del Toro, Sylvester Stallone, Salma Hayek, Arnold Schwarzenegger, Vicente Fox, Tony Saca, former US treasurer Rosario Marin, former President of Honduras Ricardo Maduro and his ex-wife  Aguas Santas Ocaña Navarro, former Honduran President Jose Manuel Zelaya Rosales and first Lady Xiomara de Zelaya, Alvaro Colom Caballeros, Guatemala's current President and current Honduras President Juan Orlando Hernandez among other Latin America Presidents Los Angeles Mayor Antonio Villaraigosa .

On 2006, she traveled to Central America to work on various special reports on El Salvador, Honduras and Guatemala. She also covered el Cucuy de la Mañana's "Votos por America" tour.
 
Dunia went to Mexico and report on the terrible accident at the Pasta de Conchos mine in 2006. In 2006, millions of people participated in protests over a proposed change to U.S. immigration policy, Dunia was in the heart on Los Angeles, CA covering this massive protest to the world as Telemundo Network Correspondent.
She also cover other significant events like 9/11, the 2008 historic U.S. Presidential election.

Recognitions
Elvir has received many recognitions because of her reports on human interest stories.

Elvir won 6 Emmy Awards in the last year's. She was also nominated for an Emmy Award in the category of Best Investigative Report in Los Angeles in 2001. She also won 2  "Golden Mike" one with her report Corners of Sin as the Best Investigative Report of the year and a second one with a special breaking news coverage.

Elvir has received various special recognitions from the Los Angeles City, Los Angeles County, the California State Senate, she was awarded with a special recognition from the California State Assembly and members of the US Congress.

She also won the GLAAD Award in 2005.

She was invited as a special guest to visit the White House by The National Association of Latina Leaders (NALL).

In 2006, she received the "Distinguished Award Visitor" from the city of La Ceiba, where the 2006 Miss Honduras beauty pageant took place. Up until that point, she was virtually unknown in her own country.

In August 2007, she received the "Journalist of the Year" Award in Toronto, Ontario, Canada at the "Toni Reyes Summer Festival" where over 70 thousand Hispanics from different nationalities gathered to celebrate.

On September 20, 2007 she received from the Camara de Comercio e Industria de Tegucigalpa (Tegucigalpa Chamber of Commerce and Industry) the "Orgullo Hondureño en el Extranjero" Award for her community service and the positive impact to other Hondurans in the United States.

In 2008 Dunia's story "Danger in Hospitals" was selected by NAHJ (National Association of Hispanic Journalists) as the best Investigative report of the year, recognition she received in Washington D.C.

Dunia received the Los Angeles Press Club Award for "Best Public Service Program", a 30-minute piece.

In 2011 Dunia was awarded with the "NBC Ovation Award" Above and Beyond distinction.
These are just few of the many acknowledgments Dunia has received during the last 20 years.

References

People from La Ceiba
Honduran journalists
Honduran women journalists
American television journalists
1973 births
Living people
Honduran emigrants to the United States